National Route 458 is a national highway of Japan connecting the towns of Shinjō and Kaminoyama in Yamagata prefecture, with a total length of 112.5 km (69.9 mi).

References

National highways in Japan
Roads in Yamagata Prefecture